Nekagenet Crippa (born 16 September 1994) is an Ethiopian-born Italian middle distance runner and cross-country runner who won a national title in 2019 and at senior level.

He his the older brother of the middle-distance runner and Italian national recordman Yemaneberhan Crippa.

Career
Junior mountain running world champion in 2013, he stopped athletics due to an injury. He returned to competitions in 2018 at the age of 24, immediately achieving good results such as an Italian title in the half marathon and a team bronze at the European cross-country running.

Achievements

National titles
Crippa won a national championship at individual senior level.
Italian Athletics Championships
Half marathon: 2019

See also
 Italian team at the running events

References

External links

1994 births
Living people
Italian male middle-distance runners
Italian male cross country runners
Athletics competitors of Gruppo Sportivo Esercito